In Search of the Most Amazing Thing is a video game designed by Tom Snyder Productions and published by Spinnaker Software in 1983. Although marketed as a children's game, it drew acclaim from players of all ages for its original concept and imaginative game world.

Plot 
The game begins on a mysterious planet, Porquatz, with the androgynous player, Terry Bailey, exploring his/her subterranean home city by elevator. Terry's mysterious uncle, Smoke Bailey, has recently arrived in a strange craft known as the B-Liner, a hybridized all-terrain vehicle and hot-air balloon. Finding Smoke napping in his room, and waking him from his reverie with repeated shouts, Terry is tasked by Smoke to embark in the B-Liner on a quest for a lost artifact known only as "The Most Amazing Thing".

Navigating the world outside the city, known as the Mire, is a considerable challenge. Driving the B-Liner over the tar-like surface is easy, but leaves you open to being chased and temporarily paralyzed by Mire Crabs. To avoid these, the B-Liner can use its balloon to float above the Mire in unpowered flight, but this requires the player to carefully trim the B-Liner's altitude to take advantage of different wind currents prevailing at different altitudes, as well as monitoring fuel supply and navigating by dead reckoning.

Gameplay 
To investigate notable objects in the Mire, the player can perform EVA using a personal jetpack. Encounters range from the benign Popberry trees, which provide food for the player, to the deadly Mire crabs, to the quizzical merchant aliens who provide Terry with vital clues and supplies for the quest. To trade with these aliens, the player must create Musix, a simple line-drawing translated by the game into a melody, which is then evaluated by the aliens according to their aesthetics, which vary according to the tribe they belong to. Due to their intrinsic shyness, the aliens communicate with the player entirely in a form of semaphore code, utilizing the only visible part of their anatomy: twin antennae, protruding coyly over the edge of the aliens' "desks".

Development 
The game was Tom Snyder's first title after joining Spinnaker Software to make educational software for home and the classroom. A March 1983 edition of Arcade Express said the game was due to be released that month. A self-professed "software novelist", his approach to the game's development was like a novelist outlining the opening chapters of a book, working on them as written fiction pieces before translating the content to a game.

Reception
Byte magazine called In Search of the Most Amazing Thing "an exciting adventure [and] a valuable educational tool", and added that it "clearly points out the versatility of the IBM PC as an educational tool, a recreational computer, and a business machine. I highly recommend this game". PC Magazine praised the game's logic, humor, and pacing, while Antic thought that it was "complex, challenging, and imaginative". Australian Apple Review praised the game as "probably the best adventure program ever written for computers".

References

External links

1983 video games
Apple II games
Atari 8-bit family games
Commodore 64 games
DOS games
Single-player video games
Spinnaker Software games
Video games developed in the United States